Cartoon Network Studios is an American animation studio owned by the Warner Bros. Television Studios division of Warner Bros. Entertainment, a subsidiary of Warner Bros. Discovery. The studio is the production arm of Cartoon Network, and started operating on October 21, 1994, as a division of Hanna-Barbera until the latter was absorbed into Warner Bros. Animation in 2001.

Located in California, the studio primarily produces and develops animated programs and shorts for Cartoon Network and Cartoonito. Recently, the studio has also developed programs for Adult Swim, TBS, and HBO Max. The studio has also produced its sole theatrically released film, The Powerpuff Girls Movie, distributed by its sister company, Warner Bros. Pictures.

History

1990s to 2000s

Hanna-Barbera era 

Cartoon Network Studios originated as a division of Hanna-Barbera Cartoons, Inc. that focused on producing original programming for Cartoon Network, including What a Cartoon!, Dexter's Laboratory, Johnny Bravo, and The Powerpuff Girls. Following the 1996 merger of Hanna-Barbera's parent, Turner Broadcasting System with Time Warner, and after being located on Cahuenga Boulevard in Los Angeles since 1963, the Hanna-Barbera studio, its archives, and its extensive animation art collection, were relocated in 1998 to Sherman Oaks Galleria in Sherman Oaks, California, where Warner Bros. Animation was located. This relocation was executed by its chief executive, Jean MacCurdy. On July 21, 1999, Cartoon Network officially started the studio to separate itself from the complete folding of Hanna-Barbera into Warner Bros. Animation that started after the Time Warner merger. Following the death of the studio's co-founder William Hanna in 2001, Cartoon Network Studios took over the animation function of Hanna-Barbera.

Separating under Cartoon Network 
In 2000, Cartoon Network Studios transferred its production offices to a new facility located at 300 N 3rd St. in Burbank, California, which was the location of a former Pacific Bell telephone exchange. Former DiC and Nickelodeon employees Brian A. Miller and Jennifer Pelphrey have managed the company since it began production in the same year. The current headquarters of the animation studio was christened on May 22, 2000, by veteran animator and animation advisor Joseph Barbera with a bottle of champagne.

In 2002, the studio produced two television pilots for Cartoon Network's late night programming block Adult Swim: Welcome to Eltingville and The Groovenians. Neither of them were picked as full series. Also, the studio released this year its only theatrical film to date: The Powerpuff Girls Movie, based on The Powerpuff Girls, which received positive reviews from critics but performed poorly at the box office. In 2006, Cartoon Network Studios collaborated with sister studio Williams Street for the first time for Korgoth of Barbaria, a television pilot made for Adult Swim, which was also not green-lit as a series.

In 2007, Cartoon Network Studios began its first foray into live-action with the hybrid series Out of Jimmy's Head, and then its first fully live-action project, Ben 10: Race Against Time and its sequel, Ben 10: Alien Swarm, along with the television pilots Locker 514, Siblings and Stan the Man. The studio's first live-action series Tower Prep would arrive in 2010. Former New Line Television producer Mark Costa was hired to oversee the projects and Cartoon Network Studios' live-action production company Alive and Kicking, Inc.. Incredible Crew was the last series in that genre the studio produced for Cartoon Network. Despite the failure of live-action on the channel, the studio's infrastructure was retained to produce live-action fare for sibling programming block Adult Swim, identifying on-air as Alive and Kicking, along with two other companies (Rent Now Productions and Factual Productions), instead of using the Cartoon Network Studios banner.

2010s

Exploring animation 

In 2010, Adventure Time premiered on Cartoon Network. It began life as a short featured on Nicktoons' Random! Cartoons that was ultimately not green-lit as a series by that channel. Cartoon Network picked it up later, and production of the show moved to Cartoon Network Studios. The show ran until 2018 with 10 seasons and 283 episodes. A film was announced in 2015, but in 2018 Adam Muto said that the film was never officially announced. In 2019, a continuation, titled Adventure Time: Distant Lands, was announced for HBO Max with a release in 2020. Also this year, The Cartoonstitute, an incubator series similar to What a Cartoon!, debuted on Cartoon Network Video. The pilots of Regular Show and Uncle Grandpa were presented here among with other shorts, with the Uncle Grandpa pilot also serving as a basis for Secret Mountain Fort Awesome, which preceded the actual series.

In 2014, Cartoon Network Studios produced its first miniseries, Over the Garden Wall. The following year, Long Live the Royals was also premiered.

In 2016, the studio produced two reboots based on The Powerpuff Girls and Ben 10 respectively. Also, the studio produced its first television series based on a series of online shorts, Mighty Magiswords.

In 2017, after plans as old as 2002 for a film failed to work, Samurai Jack was revived for a fifth and final season, which the studio returned to produce for Adult Swim, to critical acclaim, concluding the series after its cancellation from Cartoon Network in 2004. Also this year, it was announced that Cartoon Network Studios, in collaboration with Studio T, would produce the adult animated series Close Enough for TBS, created by Regular Show creator J. G. Quintel.

In 2019, after handling a few episodes of Harvey Birdman, Attorney at Law, the second season of Black Dynamite, the above-mentioned fifth season of Samurai Jack and producing the above-mentioned television pilots Welcome to Eltingville, The Groovenians and Korgoth of Barbaria, Cartoon Network Studios produced its first full program for Adult Swim: Primal, an adult animated series from Genndy Tartakovsky. The first five episodes were also packaged for a limited theatrical release as a feature film titled Primal: Tales of Savagery.

Cartoon Network Studios also began to produce content for parent company WarnerMedia's upcoming streaming service HBO Max, including Adventure Time: Distant Lands. After the failure of its planned animation block, Close Enough was also shifted from TBS to HBO Max.

2020s 
In August 2020, Warner Bros. Animation president Sam Register was appointed head of the studio. Amy Friedman was named head of programming for Cartoon Network after Rob Sorcher resigned his roles as head of the studio and chief content officer, and switching to Warner Bros. Television Group for an overall production deal.

In 2021, Jason DeMarco was named SVP for Anime & Action Series/Longform for Warner Bros. Animation and Cartoon Network Studios, and Cartoon Network Studios Europe was renamed Hanna-Barbera Studios Europe as a tribute to the original Hanna-Barbera studio.

On May 11, 2022, after Tom Ascheim exited his role as president and departed, the Warner Bros. Global Kids, Young Adults and Classics division was dissolved as part of a restructuring by new owner Warner Bros. Discovery, with its studios—including Cartoon Network Studios—moved directly under Warner Bros. Television.

On October 11, 2022, Cartoon Network Studios and Warner Bros. Animation consolidated their development and production teams as part of a restructuring by Warner Bros. Television, with Audrey Diehl overseeing kids and family, Peter Girardi overseeing adult animation, and Sammy Perlmutter overseeing animated longform productions. The merger will not impact their output as labels, with Cartoon Network Studios continuing to focus on original content, and Warner Bros. Animation used for classic franchises.

In February 2023, it was announced that Cartoon Network Studios would be moving out of its offices in Burbank, which they have been operating from since 2000. Rumors suggest that all staff would be moved to the Warner Bros. Animation building in Sherman Oaks, or its studio lot in Burbank, which happens to be minutes away from the studio building, or even an unused building in Burbank, California.

Filmography

See also 

 List of programs broadcast by Cartoon Network
 List of animation studios owned by Warner Bros. Discovery
 Hanna-Barbera - the former owner and predecessor of Cartoon Network Studios
 Hanna-Barbera Studios Europe - European sister studio of Cartoon Network Studios owned by Warner Bros. Television Studios UK
 Warner Bros. Animation - sister studio of Cartoon Network Studios
 Williams Street - sister studio of Cartoon Network Studios

References

External links 
 

 
1994 establishments in California
American animation studios
Studios
Entertainment companies based in California
Companies based in Burbank, California
American companies established in 1994
Mass media companies established in 1994
Warner Bros. Television Studios
Warner Bros. divisions